The Hamptons Collegiate Baseball League (HCBL) is a summer baseball organization located in The Hamptons in the U.S. state of New York. It is a seven-team league consisting of the Sag Harbor Whalers, Southampton Breakers, Westhampton Aviators, North Fork Ospreys, Riverhead Tomcats, Shelter Island Bucks and most recently, the South Shore Clippers. The HCBL is a member of the National Alliance of College Summer Baseball and is sanctioned by Major League Baseball.

Teams 
Hamptons Collegiate Baseball's regular season begins in early June and concludes with the HCBL playoffs in early August. For the playoffs between 2008 and 2012 during the HCBL's affiliation with the Atlantic Collegiate Baseball League, the winner of the HCBL played the Kaiser and/or Wolff Division winner for the ACBL championship.

Former Teams

 Center Moriches Battlecats: 2012-2013
 Montauk Mustangs: 2014-2016

HCBL Champions
2008 – Sag Harbor Whalers|Hampton Whalers
2009 – Westhampton Aviators
2010 – North Fork Ospreys
2011 – Westhampton Aviators
2012 – Southampton Breakers
2013 – North Fork Ospreys
2014 – Southampton Breakers
2015 – Shelter Island Bucks
2016 – Westhampton Aviators
2017 – Long Island Road Warriors
2018 – Riverhead Tomcats
2019 – Westhampton Aviators
2020 – No season (COVID-19)
2021 – Southampton Breakers
2022 – Sag Harbor Whalers

Atlantic Collegiate Baseball League Champions (2008-2012) 
2009 – Westhampton Aviators
2010 – North Fork Ospreys

MLB Draft History

Bold = reached major leagues

External links
Hamptons Collegiate Baseball League official website

The Hamptons, New York
Summer baseball leagues
Baseball leagues in New York (state)
College baseball in New York (state)
Sports leagues established in 2007
2007 establishments in New York (state)